Popovo or Kështjellas is a village located in the Municipality of Podujevo, District of Pristina, Kosovo.

Geography
Village is located on the gorge of Kačandol river (major tributary of the river Lab). Village has a close geographical position toward four Municipal Centres in North-eastern Kosovo: Podujevo (9 km / 6 mi. ENE), Vučitrn (12 km / 7 mi. WSW), Kosovska Mitrovica (18 km / 11 mi. W), Pristina (24 km / 15 mi. SSE).

Notes and references
Notes:

References:

Villages in Podujevo